Monte Carlo is a Macanese professional football club which currently competes in the Liga de Elite.

Honours
 Liga de Elite
 Champions (5): 2002, 2003, 2004, 2008, 2013
 Runners-up (4): 2006, 2011, 2012, 2017

Continental history

Current squad
Squad for the 2020 Liga de Elite

Former players

  Miguel Heitor

Notes

Football clubs in Macau
1984 establishments in Macau